This is a partial discography of Lohengrin, an  opera by Richard Wagner. The first production was in Weimar, Germany on 28 August 1850 at the Staatskapelle Weimar, conducted by Franz Liszt.

References
Notes

External links
 Recordings of Lohengrin, wagnerdisco.net

Opera discographies